Borisovo is a rural locality (a village) in Grigoryevskoye Rural Settlement, Gus-Khrustalny District, Vladimir Oblast, Russia. The population was 3 as of 2010.

Geography 
The village is located 4 km north from Grigoryevo, 22 km south-east from Gus-Khrustalny.

References 

Rural localities in Gus-Khrustalny District
Melenkovsky Uyezd